The 2018 IAAF Road Race Label Events were the eleventh edition of the global series of road running competitions given Label status by the International Association of Athletics Federations (IAAF). The series included a total of 114 road races: 56 Gold, 26 Silver and 32 Bronze. In terms of distance, 75 races were marathons, 26 were half marathons, 9 were 10K runs, and 4 were held over other distances. The series included all six World Marathon Majors in the Gold category.

Races

References

Race calendar
Calendar 2018 IAAF Label Road Races. IAAF. Retrieved 2019-09-22.

2018
IAAF Road Race Label Events